Tamba dichroma is a noctuoid moth in the family Erebidae first described by Prout in 1932.

Characteristics
This species is really strongly sexually dimorphic.

Distribution and habitat
It is found in Borneo, Sumatra, Peninsular Malaysia, and Thailand. The species is frequent in the lowlands forests.

References

Erebidae
Boletobiinae
Moths of Borneo
Moths of Malaysia
Moths described in 1932